Some Things Never Change is the tenth album by the English rock band Supertramp, released in March 1997.

Overview
Some Things Never Change represented a deliberate return to the band's earlier sound (before Free as a Bird), using more organic recording techniques than on their previous studio album. John Helliwell recounted that "we recorded the album in a way that Supertramp never had and that was by all going into the studio together and doing it as a much more live thing."

The album features the single "You Win, I Lose", which was a minor hit in Germany and also received considerable airplay in Canada. Two more singles were released commercially: "Listen To Me Please" and "Sooner or Later".

The song "Live to Love You" (which was also released as a promo single) features both the 'tackled' sound from the Coleco Electronic Quarterback handheld electronic game, as well as the Trouble "Pop-o-matic bubble" sounds from their 1979 hit "The Logical Song".

Cover art
Rick Davies explained the concept behind the album cover: "It's something to tie in with the title. In England people have tea at four o'clock and it doesn't matter where they are or what sort of social plane they're on, they will have that tea."

Reception

AllMusic commented that the album retains the same style and strong instrumental interplay from the band's glory years, but lacks the "ingratiatingly catchy melodies" of that era, making it of strong interest to the band's fans but much less to casual listeners.

Track listing
All songs written and sung by Rick Davies except where noted.

"Give Me a Chance" was not included on all editions of the album.

Personnel
Supertramp
Rick Davies – keyboards, vocals
Mark Hart – guitars, keyboards, vocals
John Helliwell – saxophones, woodwinds
Cliff Hugo – bass
Bob Siebenberg – drums (except on "And The Light")
Lee Thornburg – trombones, trumpets, background vocals
Carl Verheyen – guitars
Tom Walsh – percussion (all tracks); drums on "And The Light"

Additional personnel
Bob Danziger – Kalimbas
Karen Lawrence – background vocals
Kim Nail – background vocals
Fred Mandel - guitars on "And The Light" (uncredited as a musician on the cover)

Production
Producers: Jack Douglas, Fred Mandel
Executive producer: Rick Davies
Engineers: Ian Gardiner, Jay Messina
Assistant engineers: Ian Gardiner, Mike Scotella
Mixing assistant: Roy Clark, Brian Hargrove
Mastering: Bob Ludwig
Creative director: Richard Frankel
Cover art: Dimo Safari
Portraits: Dennis Keeley

Charts

Weekly charts

Year-end charts

Certifications and sales

References

1997 albums
EMI Records albums
Supertramp albums
Albums produced by Jack Douglas (record producer)